Yonggu is a town of Huaiji County in western Guangdong province, China. The Yonggu dialect of the Biao language is spoken there.

References 

Towns in Guangdong
Zhaoqing